Lustral may refer to:

 Sertraline (also known as "Lustral"), an antidepressant
 Lustral (band), an electronic music band
 "Lustral", a song by BT from _

See also

 Lustre (disambiguation)
 Lustrum
 Water of lustration, or lustral water, biblical term
 Lustral water